A list of horror films released in 2014.

References

2014
2014-related lists